Antonio García Martínez, also known by his initials AGM, is a New York Times best-selling author and tech entrepreneur. He is a former product manager for Facebook, the CEO-founder of AdGrok, and a former quantitative analyst for Goldman Sachs.

He has contributed articles to Wired, Vanity Fair, Business Insider, The Guardian, HuffPost, and The Washington Post.

Career 
After studying physics in the University of California, Berkeley, García Martínez started working at Goldman Sachs in September 2005. After leaving Goldman Sachs in March 2008, he started working at Adchemy as a Research Scientist in April 2008. After leaving Adchemy in May 2010, he founded AdGrok, a Y Combinator-backed advertising platform. He sold AdGrok to Twitter in 2011 and started working at Facebook in April 2011 as a director of Facebook's Ad Exchange before leaving Facebook in April 2013. He worked briefly at Apple in 2021, before the company severed ties with him as a result of internal backlash over his hiring.

In 2016, García Martínez released a book entitled Chaos Monkeys: Obscene Fortune and Random Failure in Silicon Valley published by HarperCollins, which is an autobiography that details his career experiences with launching AdGrok, selling it to Twitter, and working at Facebook from its pre-IPO stage.

He is a frequent contributor to Wired.

Apple employment controversy 
On May 10, 2021, Business Insider reported that García Martínez had begun working on the Advertising Platforms team at Apple. 9to5Mac's coverage highlighted that some of the content of Chaos Monkeys did not appear to be aligned with Apple's public messaging around inclusion and diversity. Subsequently, news about García Martínez's hire prompted Apple employees to circulate a petition that the views expressed in Martinez's book were in opposition to the company's inclusion efforts. On May 12, Apple confirmed to Axios that García Martínez was no longer employed at the company, stating that it had "always strived to create an inclusive, welcoming workplace." García Martínez has said in a statement that Apple executives were aware of his book, and that his personal references were questioned about his character.

Books
 García Martínez, Antonio. Chaos Monkeys: Obscene Fortune and Random Failure in Silicon Valley. HarperCollins. .

References

External links 

What ex-Facebook employee wants you to know about Silicon Valley CBS News
García Martínez's blog on Substack

21st-century American businesspeople
21st-century American male writers
21st-century American non-fiction writers
American autobiographers
American business writers
American male non-fiction writers
Apple Inc. employees
Facebook employees
Goldman Sachs people
Living people
Year of birth missing (living people)